Shougang Gymnasium is an indoor sporting arena located in Beijing, China. The capacity of the arena is 6,000 spectators and opened in 2002.  It hosts indoor sporting events such as basketball and volleyball.  It hosts the Beijing Ducks of the Chinese Basketball Association.

References

Indoor arenas in China
Sports venues in Beijing
Basketball venues in China
Volleyball venues in China